The Detroit Diesel Series 92 is a two-stroke cycle, V-block diesel engine, produced with versions ranging from six to 16 cylinders. Among these, the most popular were the 6V92 and 8V92, which were V6 and V8 configurations of the same engine respectively. The series was introduced in 1974 as a rebored version of its then-popular sister series, the Series 71. Both the Series 71 and Series 92 engines were popularly used in on-highway vehicle applications.

History
The Series 92 engines were introduced in 1974.

While the basic mechanics of the 92 series indicated superior performance and durability, early prototypes were challenged by breakdowns resulting from the torque inherent in the design. Carl Kamradt, the senior engineer in Detroit Diesel Allison's E5, or Experimental Department, was responsible for working through the practical applications of the engine, resulting in the 92 Series becoming the favored choice for applications requiring high torque and dependability. Upon Mr. Kamradt's retirement in 1984, the E-5 division was eliminated as the 92 Series ran its course.
In the 1980s and early 1990s, the Series 92 was used as a major bus engine in North America. It was also available for several other applications: Trucks, buses, motor homes, construction, fire trucks/apparatus, industrial equipment, several military vehicles, aircraft and marine applications.

The Series 92 left the market in the summer of 1995 and the four stroke Detroit Diesel engine Series 60 was introduced as a replacement.

Features and specifications
9.0 litre (V6), 12.1 litre (V8), 18.1 litre (V12) and 24.1 litre (V16)
Power ratings ranging from 
Supported the DDECI, DDECII, DDECIII and DDECIV.

Power output specifications (6V92)
  @ 1200 rpm; 253 horsepower governed at 2100 rpm
  @ 1200 rpm; 277 horsepower governed at 2100 rpm
  @ 1300 rpm; 300 horsepower governed at 2100 rpm
   @ 1300 rpm; 335 horsepower governed at 2100 rpm

Power output specifications (8V92)
  @ 1300 rpm; 350-550 horsepower governed at 1800-2100 rpm

Model number
The model number indicates the basic configuration of the engine. The model designator consists of the number of cylinders (6, 8, 12, or 16), the block layout (V), engine series (92), and a lettered suffix which provides information about forced induction (T for turbocharged, A for aftercooled), so for instance, an 8V92TA designates a Series 92 V8 engine that is turbocharged and aftercooled.

Notes

Detroit Diesel (2 cycle) common model and suffix codes

Competing power plants
Detroit Diesel 6-71 (inline)
Detroit Diesel 8V71
Caterpillar 3406
Cummins L10
International HT530
Cummins 6CTA8.3
Detroit Diesel Series 60

See also
 List of Detroit Diesel products

References

External links 

 Video of the GMC RTS Bus
 

92
Two-stroke diesel engines